Marc Marzenit (born Marc Martínez on March 27, 1983) is a DJ and music producer from Barcelona, Spain.

Career

Early Influences 
Marc's interest in music began at the young age of nine, making sounds on a small Casio PT1 keyboard that he attempted to plug into his father's Atari 1040ST computer. He also had musical influence from his father, who was working at a record shop in Barcelona during Marc's childhood. He obtained his first synthesizer, a Casio HT-6000, when he was eleven. He then took his musical involvement to the classical genre, studying solfège and piano at Conservatori Municipal de Mollerussa. At the age of thirteen, Marc's parents bought him an acoustic upright piano. He practiced the piano for seven years but instead of setting out on the path of classical music the young Marc followed his initial interest in electronic music. His knowledge and training in the classical arts would create a foundation for his success as an artist in this realm of music.

Musical Education 
Marc continued to acquire what he needed to make electronic music with a Pentium 200 mHz computer, the Cubase software and a CD player. With these, he played his first gigs as a DJ in small venues around Lleida, Spain when he was 15 years old. In this same year, 1998, Marc visited the Sónar Festival for the first time, where he enjoyed the sounds of Laurent Garnier, Jay-Jay Johanson, and Jeff Mills. He left Sónar with his first sampler after winning an Akai hardware sampler in the Sonar Pro lottery. The following year, 1999, Marc decided to expand his knowledge of the Cubase software by enrolling in a course at the University of Lleida, however, he was too young to enroll in the course himself so he signed up under his Mother's name. He also began giving electronic music lessons through various public programs in Lleida.

In 2001 he began using the Reason software system by Propellerhead Software. So far he had not released any tracks, but was spending his time educating himself on equipment, sound and technique. The following year, at the age of 19, Marc purchased his first laptop, an iBook G3 and played his first live set in Mollerussa, Spain. In 2003 Marc moved back to Barcelona, where he studied for three years to obtain a bachelor's degree in Audio Engineering. While studying, he was also working as a sound engineer for the Teatre L'Amistat, the public theater in Mollerussa and continued teaching music production in the city of Lleida. His professional involvement allowed him to work in different musical themes in television and radio ads as well as several audio-visual projects.

Building A Career 
Marc's gigs became more consistent as he started playing at Club Zoreks about every two months. There he met other artists such as David Carreta, Funk D’void and Alex Under. On December 25, 2005, Marc's career took a turn when he played at club Florida 135, his biggest performance as a DJ thus far. The night was considered a success as it drew a large crowd and Marc was soon after taken on by an international booking manager, Fran Balsa. Shortly after his performance at Florida 135, in April 2006, Marc made his first international trip to play a set at the clubs Zurmöbelfabrik and Pulp Mansion in Berlin, Germany. While in Berlin, Marc also met Xema Belmonte, Sergio Rodrigo, and Jordi Sansa, with whom he would soon form the music label Paradigma Musik.

Discography

Original Tracks 
 2006: Trozitos de Navidad (Paradigma Musik) EP & Trozitos de Navidad (Primavera Remix)
 2006: Music Save Me (Paradigma Musik) EP
 2007: Spheere (Regular) EP
 2007: Today is Yesterday (Regular) EP & Today is Yesterday (Claustrophobia Remix)
 2009: Second Vision – collaboration with Henry Saiz (Sudbeat) Visions EP
 2009: Angels Die (Sudbeat) Visions EP
 2009: Soul Fog (Sudbeat) Visions EP
 2009: I Don't Wanna Be a Hype (Paradigma Musik) From The Deep	
 2009: Not Assigned (Bedrock Records) Bedrock Eleven
 2009: Expiritualized (Bedrock Records) Bedrock Eleven
 2009: Unexpiritualized (Bedrock Records) Bedrock Eleven
 2009: ITS Caracas (Paradigma Musik) Paradigma 014
 2010: Maya Colors (Cocoon Digital) Maya & Tulku EP
 2010: Tulku (Cocoon Digital) Maya & Tulku EP
 2010: Motor (Cocoon Digital) Maya & Tulku EP
 2010: Neo Galaxy (Bedrock Records) Bedrock Structures
 2011: 10,000 Fears - Free Download on SoundCloud

Appearances 
 2006: Electro Thinks (Votox Records) Votox No1 Welxxcome
 2006: Trozitos de Navidad (Trax Magazine) Trax #30
 2006: Remixer (Miga) Exponencial
 2006: Remixer (Micromix) Ferik - Micromix 70
 2006: Remixer (Zerinnerung) Stimulux - Southern Sounds Vol. 2
 2007: Trozitos de Navidad Primavera Remix (Songbird) Tiësto - In Search Of Sunrise 6: Ibiza
 2007: Spheere (Renaissance) John Digweed - Transitions Vol. 3
 2007: Trozitos de Navidad Primavera Remix (Black Hole Recordings) Mr Sam - Opus
 2007: Trozitos de Navidad (The Sound of Everything) Concealed Truth
 2007: Trozitos de Navidad (Icic) Electronic Music from Catalonia - De Catalunya 2007
 2008: Trozitos de Navidad (121 Records) La Plage Des Bikinis
 2009: I Don't Wanna Be A Hype (Paradigma Musik) From The Deep
 2009 : Not Assigned (Cocoon Recordings) Sven Väth - In The Mix - The Sound Of The 10th Season
 2009: Not Assigned, Expiritualized & Unexpiritualized (Bedrock Records) John Digweed - Bedrock Eleven
 2009: Soul Fog & Second Vision (Renaissance) Hernán Cattáneo - Renaissance: The Masters Series Part 13
 2010: Neo Galaxy (Bedrock Records) John Digweed - Structures
 2010: Saint Two (Renaissance) Hernán Cattáneo - Renaissance: The Masters Series Part 16 - Parallel
 2010: ITS Caracas (Paul Ritch Remix), (Kontor Records) Felix Kröcher - Discover

Remixes 
 2008: Together (Marc Marzenit Remix) Simon & Shaker - Surfaces #1: Plastic (Armada Music)
 2008: We Are Losing Touch (Marc Marzenit Remix) bRUNA - Heartache E.P. (Paradigma Musik)
 2008: Vancouver (Marc Marzenit Remix) – Henry Saiz (Catalan! Music, ICIC)
 2008: Together (Marc Marzenit Remix) Funkagenda - Together (Shelvin Records)
 2008: Vancouver (Marc Marzenit Remix) Henry Saiz - Vancouver (Natura Sanoris)
 2010: Ripple (Marc Marzenit Remix) Max Cooper - Expressions Remixes (Traum Schallplatten)
 2010: Bloody Hands (Marc Marzenit Remix) Peter Horrevorts - Bloody Hands EP (Gem Records)
 2010: Neo (Marc Marzenit Remix) Simon & Shaker - Space Of Sound Festival 2010 (Blanco y Negro)
 2010: Bloody Hands (Marc Marzenit Monster Remix) Wally Lopez - Global Underground (Global Underground Ltd.)
 2010: Bloody Hands (Marc Marzenit Monster Mix) Pan-Pot - OHMcast 028 (OnlyHouseMusic)
 2010: Bloody Hands (Marc Marzenit Remix) Secret Cinema - Welcome To My Club - 1st Issue (Gem Records)
 2011: Mutant (Marc Marzenit Haunted House Remix) – Patch Park (Ground Factory Records)
 2011: Aurora Borealis (Henry Saiz & Marc Marzenit Remix) - Ian O'Donovan (Bedrock Records)
 2011: ID (Marc Marzenit Remix) - Monaque (microCastle)

Notes

External links 
 Official Site
 Paradigma Musik
 Marc Marzenit channel on YouTube
 Marc Marzenit on Beatport
 Marc Marzenit on Soundcloud

References 
 Martinez, M. (2011, May 30). Personal interview.
 Marc Marzenit Bio. (2011). Retrieved May 29, 2011, from http://www.marcmarzenit.com/biografia.html

Spanish DJs
Club DJs
Living people
Remixers
1983 births
Electronic dance music DJs